Design optimization is an engineering design methodology using a mathematical formulation of a design problem to support selection of the optimal design among many alternatives. Design optimization involves the following stages:

 Variables: Describe the design alternatives  
 Objective: Elected functional combination of variables (to be maximized or minimized)  
 Constraints: Combination of Variables expressed as equalities or inequalities that must be satisfied for any acceptable design alternative
 Feasibility: Values for set of variables that satisfies all constraints and minimizes/maximizes Objective.

Design optimization problem 

The formal mathematical (standard form) statement of the design optimization problem is 

where

  is a vector of n real-valued design variables 
  is the objective function 
  are equality constraints 
  are  inequality constraints 
  is a set constraint that includes additional restrictions on  besides those implied by the equality and inequality constraints.

The problem formulation stated above is a convention called the negative null form, since all constraint function are expressed as equalities and negative inequalities with zero on the right-hand side. This convention is used so that numerical algorithms developed to solve design optimization problems can assume a standard expression of the mathematical problem.

We can introduce the vector-valued functions

  

to rewrite the above statement in the compact expression

We call  the set or system of (functional) constraints and  the set constraint.

Application 
Design optimization applies the methods of mathematical optimization to design problem formulations and it is sometimes used interchangeably with the term engineering optimization.  When the objective function f is a vector rather than a scalar, the problem becomes a multi-objective optimization one. If the design optimization problem has more than one mathematical solutions the methods of global optimization are used to identified the global optimum.

Optimization Checklist 

 Problem Identification
 Initial Problem Statement
 Analysis Models
 Optimal Design Model
 Model Transformation
 Local Iterative Techniques
 Global Verification
 Final Review

A detailed and rigorous description of the stages and practical applications with examples can be found in the book Principles of Optimal Design.

Practical design optimization problems are typically solved numerically and many optimization software exist in academic and commercial forms. There are several domain-specific applications of design optimization posing their own specific challenges in formulating and solving the resulting problems; these include, shape optimization, wing-shape optimization, topology optimization, architectural design optimization, power optimization. Several books, articles and journal publications are listed below for reference.

Journals 

 Journal of Engineering for Industry
 Journal of Mechanical Design
 Journal of Mechanisms, Transmissions, and Automation in Design
 Design Science
 Engineering Optimization
 Journal of Engineering Design
 Computer-Aided Design
 Journal of Optimization Theory and Applications
 Structural and Multidisciplinary Optimization
 Journal of Product Innovation Management
 International Journal of Research in Marketing

See also 

 Design Decisions Wiki (DDWiki) : Established by the Design Decisions Laboratory at Carnegie Mellon University in 2006 as a central resource for sharing information and tools to analyze and support decision-making

References

Further reading 

 Rutherford., Aris, ([2016], ©1961). The optimal design of chemical reactors : a study in dynamic programming. Saint Louis: Academic Press/Elsevier Science. . OCLC 952932441
 Jerome., Bracken, ([1968]). Selected applications of nonlinear programming. McCormick, Garth P.,. New York,: Wiley. . OCLC 174465
 L., Fox, Richard ([1971]). Optimization methods for engineering design. Reading, Mass.,: Addison-Wesley Pub. Co. . OCLC 150744
 Johnson, Ray C. Mechanical Design Synthesis With Optimization Applications. New York: Van Nostrand Reinhold Co, 1971.
 1905-, Zener, Clarence, ([1971]). Engineering design by geometric programming. New York,: Wiley-Interscience. . OCLC 197022
 H., Mickle, Marlin ([1972]). Optimization in systems engineering. Sze, T. W., 1921-2017,. Scranton,: Intext Educational Publishers. . OCLC 340906.
 Optimization and design; [papers]. Avriel, M.,, Rijckaert, M. J.,, Wilde, Douglass J.,, NATO Science Committee., Katholieke Universiteit te Leuven (1970- ). Englewood Cliffs, N.J.,: Prentice-Hall. [1973]. . OCLC 618414.
 J., Wilde, Douglass (1978). Globally optimal design. New York: Wiley. . OCLC 3707693.
 J., Haug, Edward (1979). Applied optimal design : mechanical and structural systems. Arora, Jasbir S.,. New York: Wiley. . OCLC 4775674.
 Uri., Kirsch, (1981). Optimum structural design : concepts, methods, and applications. New York: McGraw-Hill. . OCLC 6735289.
 Uri., Kirsch, (1993). Structural optimization : fundamentals and applications. Berlin: Springer-Verlag. . OCLC 27676129.
 Structural optimization : recent developments and applications. Lev, Ovadia E., American Society of Civil Engineers. Structural Division., American Society of Civil Engineers. Structural Division. Committee on Electronic Computation. Committee on Optimization. New York, N.Y.: ASCE. 1981. . OCLC 8182361.
 Foundations of structural optimization : a unified approach. Morris, A. J. Chichester [West Sussex]: Wiley. 1982. . OCLC 8031383.
 N., Siddall, James (1982). Optimal engineering design : principles and applications. New York: M. Dekker. . OCLC 8389250.
 1944-, Ravindran, A., (2006). Engineering optimization : methods and applications. Reklaitis, G. V., 1942-, Ragsdell, K. M. (2nd ed.). Hoboken, N.J.: John Wiley & Sons. . OCLC 61463772.
 N.,, Vanderplaats, Garret (1984). Numerical optimization techniques for engineering design : with applications. New York: McGraw-Hill. . OCLC 9785595.
 T., Haftka, Raphael (1990). Elements of Structural Optimization. Gürdal, Zafer., Kamat, Manohar P. (Second rev. edition ed.). Dordrecht: Springer Netherlands. . OCLC 851381183.
 S., Arora, Jasbir (2011). Introduction to optimum design (3rd ed.). Boston, MA: Academic Press. . OCLC 760173076.
 S.,, Janna, William. Design of fluid thermal systems (SI edition ; fourth edition ed.). Stamford, Connecticut. . OCLC 881509017.
 Structural optimization : status and promise. Kamat, Manohar P. Washington, DC: American Institute of Aeronautics and Astronautics. 1993. . OCLC 27918651.
 Mathematical programming for industrial engineers. Avriel, M., Golany, B. New York: Marcel Dekker. 1996. . OCLC 34474279.
 Hans., Eschenauer, (1997). Applied structural mechanics : fundamentals of elasticity, load-bearing structures, structural optimization : including exercises. Olhoff, Niels., Schnell, W. Berlin: Springer. . OCLC 35184040.
 1956-, Belegundu, Ashok D., (2011). Optimization concepts and applications in engineering. Chandrupatla, Tirupathi R., 1944- (2nd ed.). New York: Cambridge University Press. . OCLC 746750296.
 Okechi., Onwubiko, Chinyere (2000). Introduction to engineering design optimization. Upper Saddle River, NJ: Prentice-Hall. . OCLC 41368373.
 Optimization in action : proceedings of the Conference on Optimization in Action held at the University of Bristol in January 1975. Dixon, L. C. W. (Laurence Charles Ward), 1935-, Institute of Mathematics and Its Applications. London: Academic Press. 1976. . OCLC 2715969.
 P., Williams, H. (2013). Model building in mathematical programming (5th ed.). Chichester, West Sussex: Wiley. . OCLC 810039791.
 Integrated design of multiscale, multifunctional materials and products. McDowell, David L., 1956-. Oxford: Butterworth-Heinemann. 2010. . OCLC 610001448.
 M.,, Dede, Ercan. Multiphysics simulation : electromechanical system applications and optimization. Lee, Jaewook,, Nomura, Tsuyoshi,. London. . OCLC 881071474.
 1962-, Liu, G. P. (Guo Ping), (2001). Multiobjective optimisation and control. Yang, Jian-Bo, 1961-, Whidborne, J. F. (James Ferris), 1960-. Baldock, Hertfordshire: Research Studies Press. . OCLC 54380075.

Structural Topology Optimization 

Design